Karen delos Reyes (born Glomirose Anarna delos Reyes on September 29, 1984) is a Filipino actress and comedian of GMA Network. Karen became famous because of the McDonald's ad. She started her acting career when she joined the cast of Click on GMA Network. She was known as Savanna in the hit fantasy series Mulawin.

Filmography

Films

References

1984 births
Living people
People from Pasay
De La Salle–College of Saint Benilde alumni
Actresses from Metro Manila
Filipino women comedians
Participants in Philippine reality television series
delos Reyes

GMA Network personalities